Daylight Building is the name of multiple buildings, including:

 Daylight Building (Knoxville, Tennessee)
 Daylight Building (Bellingham, Washington), listed on the National Register of Historic Places